A wide variety of animals have names describing them as black-legged.

 Birds:
 Black-legged kittiwake
 Black-legged seriema
 Black-legged dacnis
 Amphibians:
 Black-legged dart frog
 Invertebrates:
Arthropods
Insects
 Blacklegged tick, Ixodes scapularis
 Black-legged water-snipefly, Atherix marginata
 Black-legged horsefly, Hybomitra micans
 Violet black-legged robberfly, Dioctria atricapilla
 Blackleg tortoiseshell, another name for the large tortoiseshell butterfly